Jordan Younger (born January 24, 1978) is the defensive backs coach for the Winnipeg Blue Bombers of the Canadian Football League (CFL). He is also a former professional defensive back and played for nine years in the CFL where he won two Grey Cup championships with the Toronto Argonauts.  Younger majored in political science at the University of Connecticut where he also played college football and holds the school record for career kick return touchdowns with four.

Professional playing career

NFL Europe
Younger played cornerback and returned kicks on special teams for the Rhein Fire from 2001 to 2002 and the Amsterdam Admirals in 2003.  He was named to the All-NFL Europe team in 2002 and 2003.

Toronto Argonauts
Younger's CFL career began with the Toronto Argonauts in 2004 when he led the team with 11 pass knockdowns and won a Grey Cup championship.  He was named a CFL All-Star in 2005 and 2007.

Edmonton Eskimos
On February 15, 2008, Younger was traded to the Edmonton Eskimos for running back Tyler Ebell and wide receiver T. J. Acree. He made 53 tackles and 1 interception while playing for Edmonton.  He was released by the Eskimos on January 7, 2009.

Toronto Argonauts (II)
On January 13, 2009, Younger was signed to play again for the Argonauts. On February 10, 2010, Younger was released by the Argonauts, but was later re-signed by the team on March 4, 2010. On November 25, 2012, Younger won the 100th Grey Cup with the Argonauts, serving as their defensive captain.  On November 27, 2012, Younger accompanied the Grey Cup during the Argonauts' championship parade.  On June 2, 2013, Younger did not attend the mandatory training camp sessions as he was preparing for retirement.

Football coaching career
In 2013, Younger served as defensive backs coach for the Oakville Titans.

In 2014, Younger served as the defensive backs coach for the University of Toronto Varsity Blues of CIS football.

On May 18, 2015, Younger was named the defensive backs coach for the Toronto Argonauts, marking his return to the organization since winning the 100th Grey Cup championship in 2012 as their defensive captain.

On January 5, 2018, it was announced that Younger was hired as the Defensive Backs Coach for the Winnipeg Blue Bombers. He won his third Grey Cup championship and first as a coach when the Blue Bombers defeated the Hamilton Tiger-Cats in the 107th Grey Cup game.

References

External links
CFL profile

 

1978 births
African-American players of Canadian football
American football cornerbacks
Amsterdam Admirals players
Arizona Cardinals players
Canadian football defensive backs
UConn Huskies football players
Edmonton Elks players
Indiana Firebirds players
Living people
Rhein Fire players
Toronto Argonauts players
Players of American football from Trenton, New Jersey
21st-century African-American sportspeople
20th-century African-American sportspeople